Siar Baba Waterfall is a waterfall near the Siar Baba temple, situated on the Chenab River in Kotla village of Reasi district, Jammu and Kashmir which comes under the region of Jammu division.

Its distance from Reasi town is 11 km.

References 

Reasi district

Waterfalls of Jammu and Kashmir